Ollie Cahill (born 29 September 1975 in Clonmel) is an Irish former professional footballer, primarily a left winger. Besides the Republic of Ireland, he played in England.

Cahill had a youth career with Old Bridge where he won a Munster Youth Cup thanks to a 5–0 over Turnpike Rovers in 1993. The following year he was instrumental in Clonmel Town winning the FAI Junior Cup with a 5–1 over New Ross Celtic. He then moved to English outfit Northampton Town. He later returned to Ireland for spells with Cork City, Shelbourne, Drogheda United, Shamrock Rovers, Sporting Fingal and Bohemians.

Career
Cahill began his career with Clonmel Town, one of Ireland's top junior football clubs winning an FAI Junior Cup winners medal with them in 1994. He then spent two seasons at Northampton before returning home in the summer of 1996. Despite playing a friendly for Waterford United against Southampton he signed for Cork City. After six seasons at Cork he moved to Shelbourne in the summer of 2002. While he was with Shelbourne he won the League of Ireland championship in 2003, 2004 and 2006. Cahill was signed by Drogheda United on 23 December 2006. With Drogheda, Cahill won his fourth Premier Division title in five seasons and a Setanta Sports Cup winners medal in 2007.

Cahill signed for Shamrock Rovers on 16 January 2009 along with Stephen Bradley in what was Michael O'Neill's first signings. He departed Shamrock Rovers in July 2010 after making 53 appearances for the club. and soon signed for Sporting Fingal.

When Sporting went out of business in February 2011, Ollie moved to Dalymount Park where he joined Bohemians, making his competitive debut against Portadown in the Setanta Sports Cup.

European competition
Cahill made 41 appearances in European competition scoring twice. He scored for Shelbourne against Olimpija Ljubljana in August 2003  and again for Drogheda United against Levadia Tallinn on 16 July 2008 in a UEFA Champions League qualifier .

Retirement
Cahill retired from the game at the end of the 2011 season.

Honours
 League of Ireland: 5
 Shelbourne – 2003, 2004, 2006
 Drogheda United – 2007
 Shamrock Rovers – 2010
FAI Cup: 1
 Cork City – 1998
Setanta Sports Cup: 1
 Drogheda United – 2007
FAI Junior Cup: 1
 Clonmel Town – 1994

References

External links
O'Neill Makes First Signings

1975 births
Living people
Association footballers from County Tipperary
People from Clonmel
Association football wingers
Northampton Town F.C. players
English Football League players
Cork City F.C. players
Shelbourne F.C. players
Drogheda United F.C. players
Shamrock Rovers F.C. players
Sporting Fingal F.C. players
Republic of Ireland association footballers
League of Ireland players
Bohemian F.C. players